Kalikalam (Telugu: కలికాలం) is a 1991 Telugu movie starring Chandra Mohan, Jayasudha. The story revolves around the difficulties of a typical middle-class family, unable to earn money to lead a satisfied life. The film was remade in Kannada as Kumkuma Bhagya and in Tamil as same name.

Cast
Chandra Mohan
Jayasudha
Sai Kumar
Subhalekha Sudhakar
Suthi Velu
Narra Venkateswara Rao
Rallapalli
Brahmanandam
 Eswari Rao

Soundtrack

Music was composed by Vidyasagar. Lyrics were written by Seetharama Sastry.

References

External links
 Kalikalam in Youtube
 

Indian drama films
Films about poverty in India
Films scored by Vidyasagar
Telugu films remade in other languages
1990s Telugu-language films
Films directed by Muthyala Subbaiah